The women's 400 metres at the 2013 World Championships in Athletics was held at the Luzhniki Stadium on 10–12 August.

Heats started with Christine Ohuruogu leading 6 others under 51 with an exceptionally fast 50.20.  50 seconds was the order of the semifinal day.  Six finalists dipped under 50, and Kseniya Ryzhova was lucky Amantle Montsho had gapped the first semi with the leading qualifier of 49.56.  Ryzhova cruised in with a 50.48 to be the second automatic qualifier.  Five others ran personal bests attempting to qualify.

The fast semifinals slowed the majority of the field.  Only the medalists improved their times.  From the gun Natasha Hastings and defending champion Amantle Montsho took it out, Hastings in lane 3 making up the stagger on Christine Ohuruogu in 4.  Francena McCorory held her own and came off the final turn with Montsho but as Montsho aimed at the finish, the others went backward.  With 50 metres to go, Christine Ohuruogu had worked her way from several metres down in the turn and had pulled even, looking like a good bet for silver.  But she had other ideas.  A steady stretch run put both a diving Ohuruogu and Montsho on the line at the same time.  And that was what was posted 49.41, the same time for both.
It took a look at the photo finish to determine that Ohuruogu had won by 4 thousandths of a second.
Running a more even pace Russian Antonina Krivoshapka came off the turn even with Ohuruogu and made a stretch run of her own, overtaking the Americans and Stephanie McPherson to get a bronze medal  that she later lost following a doping violation.

In the process of running a personal best to win the championship, Ohuruogu also got Kathy Smallwood-Cook's 29-year-old British national record (from the 1984 Olympics) that had so far evaded her through her career, a career that had included two Olympic medals, including the gold in 2008, and a previous World Championship.

Records
Prior to the competition, the records were as follows:

Qualification standards

Schedule

Results

Heats
Qualification: First 4 in each heat (Q) and the next 4 fastest (q) advanced to the semifinals.

Semifinals
Qualification: First 2 in each heat (Q) and the next 2 fastest (q) advanced to the final.

Final
The final was held at 21:15.

References

External links
400 metres results at IAAF website

400 metres
400 metres at the World Athletics Championships
2013 in women's athletics